Richard Ladislaus Heschl (July 5, 1824, in Welsdorf bei Fürstenfeld, Steiermark – May 26, 1881, in Vienna) was an Austrian anatomist.

Biography 
In 1849 he received his medical doctorate from the University of Vienna, where in 1850 he became a "first assistant" to Carl von Rokitansky (1804-1878). In 1854 he was appointed professor of anatomy at the medical-surgical school in Olomouc, and during the following year became a professor of pathological anatomy in Krakow. In 1861 he became a professor at the medical-surgical school at Graz (from 1863 a full professor), serving as university rector in 1864–65. In 1875, he returned to the University of Vienna. After his death, his position at Vienna was filled by Hans Kundrat (1845-1893).

Heschl is credited as the first physician to describe the transverse temporal gyrus or "Heschl's gyrus", located in the primary auditory cortex. This anatomical structure processes incoming auditory information.

Literary works 
 Compendium der allgemeinen und speziellen pathologischen Anatomie, (1855) - Compendium of general and special pathological anatomy. 
 Sectionstechnik, (1859) 
 Über die vordere quere Schläfenwindung, (1878) - On the front transverse temporal gyrus.

References 
 Parts of this article are based on a translation of an equivalent article at the German Wikipedia, namely  Österreichisches Biographisches Lexikon 1815–1950 (ÖBL). Band 2, Verlag der Österreichischen Akademie der Wissenschaften, Wien 1959, S. 302 f. (Direktlinks auf S. 302, S. 303).

External links 
  Fasthealth.com
  Kallmann syndrome @ Who Named It
 AEIOU biographical information at AEIOU Encyclopedia

See also 
 Friedrich Albert von Zenker
 Baronet Sir William Osler, Osler's triad

19th-century Austrian people
Austrian anatomists
People from Fürstenfeld District
1824 births
1881 deaths
Academic staff of the University of Graz
Academic staff of the University of Vienna
Rectors of universities in Austria